West Yorkshire County Council (WYCC) – also known as West Yorkshire Metropolitan County Council (WYMCC) – was the top-tier local government administrative body for West Yorkshire from 1974 to 1986. A strategic authority, with responsibilities for roads, public transport, planning, emergency services and waste disposal, it was composed of 88 directly elected members drawn from the five metropolitan boroughs of West Yorkshire. West Yorkshire County Council shared power with five lower-tier district councils, each of which directed local matters.

History
Established with reference to the Local Government Act 1972, elections in 1973 brought about the county council's launch as a shadow authority, several months before West Yorkshire (its zone of influence) was officially created on 1 April 1974. The West Yorkshire County Council operated from County Hall, Wakefield, until it was abolished 31 March 1986, following the Local Government Act 1985. Its powers were passed to the five district councils of West Yorkshire (which had shared power with WYCC): City of Bradford Metropolitan District Council, Calderdale Council, Kirklees Council, Leeds City Council and Wakefield Metropolitan District Council. Some powers of the county council were restored when the district councils delegated strategic responsibilities (such as emergency services and public transport) to the county-wide West Yorkshire Joint Services and joint boards.

Its headquarters were County Hall in Wakefield. This was built in 1888 for West Riding County Council, which occupied it until its abolition in 1974. The building is now the home of Wakefield Metropolitan District Council.

The council's 88 members were first elected on 12 April 1973, to take office on 1 April 1974. They were elected for four years, and elections were held each four years thereafter.

The Coat of arms of West Yorkshire Metropolitan County Council was granted by letters patent in 1975.

Political control
The first election to the council was held in 1973, initially operating as a shadow authority before coming into its powers on 1 April 1974. Political control of the council from 1973 until its abolition in 1986 was held by the following parties:

Leadership
The leaders of the council included:

Election results

1973 West Yorkshire County Council election
1977 West Yorkshire County Council election
1981 West Yorkshire County Council election

Successor bodies
After the council was abolished in 1986, power was devolved to the five constituent district councils of Bradford, Calderdale, Kirklees, Leeds and Wakefield.  Some council functions including archive services and Trading Standards continued to be provided jointly, through West Yorkshire Joint Services, and the West Yorkshire Passenger Transport Executive and West Yorkshire Police continue to operate across the county.

In 2012, plans to revive a top-tier administrative combined authority for West Yorkshire were revealed, with Peter McBride, cabinet member for housing and investment and councillor for Kirklees, stating "what we are recreating in effect is the West Yorkshire County Council in another form, which the government abolished in 1986 but has come to realise that you need a body of that size". The West Yorkshire Combined Authority was created in April 2014.

References 

County council
Former county councils of England
History of West Yorkshire
1974 establishments in England
1986 disestablishments in England